Lorenz Bock (born August 12, 1883 in Nordstetten; died August 3, 1948 in Rottweil) was a German lawyer and politician. He was first with the Center Party, later with the Christian Democratic Union (CDU).

Life and career 
Lorenz Bock was born on August 12, 1883, in Nordstetten, (today district of Horb am Neckar). After visiting the schools in Horb am Neckar and Rottweil he studied from 1902 to 1907 jurisprudence at the Munich and at the University of Tübingen. He graduated from the clerkship at the Amtsgericht in Riedlingen, the Landgericht in Ravensburg and with the public prosecution in Stuttgart. He worked since 1910 as a lawyer in Rottweil. From 1915 to 1918 he was a participant in the First World War.
After the war Bock continued his career as a lawyer. In August 1944 he was arrested by the Gestapo. Lorenz Bock died on the evening of August 3, 1948, in Rottweil from the effects of intestinal paralysis.

Politics 
Bock joined already before the First World War, the Centre Party and was from 1919 to 1933 a member of the local council in Rottweil. He was in 1919 in the constituent assembly of the Free People's State of Württemberg. He co-worked in the formation of the new constitution. In the same year he was elected to the Parliament of Württemberg, where he stayed till 1933. From 1928 to 1933 he was chairman of the center faction in the parliament.

After Second World War Bock participated in the founding of the CDU in Rottweil (district). 
He was a member of the Advisory State Assembly Württemberg-Hohenzollern in 1946 and was elected in 1947 to the Parliament of Württemberg-Hohenzollern, where he was a member to his death. On July 8, 1947, he was elected President of Würtemberg-Hohenzollern. He then formed a coalition  of CDU, SPD and DVP. He also overtook the management of the treasury. Bock died later during his tenure. His successor as president was Gebhard Müller.

Further reading

 Klöckler, Jürgen: Abendland – Alpenland – Alemannien: Frankreich und die Neugliederungsdiskussion in Südwestdeutschland 1945–1947, p. 230, Oldenbourg Wissenschaftsverlag, München 1998, .

References

Ministers-President in Germany
Christian Democratic Union of Germany politicians
Centre Party (Germany) politicians
1883 births
1948 deaths